Rod Dodji Fanni (born 6 December 1981) is a former French footballer who last played as a centre-back for Montreal Impact in Major League Soccer. He made five appearances for the France national team between 2008 and 2010.

Club career

Early career
Fanni began his career with FC Martigues, playing in both Ligue 2 and the Championnat National. He joined RC Lens in 2002 where he made his debut in Ligue 1, as well as both the UEFA Champions League and the UEFA Cup. He played the entire 2004–05 season on loan at Châteauroux in Ligue 2.

Nice
In June 2005, he joined Nice but left after only two seasons to sign a four-year contract with Rennes, where he was viewed as a replacement for Dutch defender Mario Melchiot, who had departed for Premier League club Wigan Athletic. Fanni was named in the Ligue 1 Team of the Year for the 2008–09 season. He expressed desire to play in the Premier League and was strongly linked with a move to Newcastle United before signing for Rennes. He was also linked with Everton and West Ham United prior to signing a one-year contract extension with Rennes in November 2009, which kept Fanni tied to Les Rouges et Noirs until June 2012.

Marseille
In December 2010, Marseille successfully acquired the services of Fanni.

Al-Arabi SC and Charlton Athletic
In 2015 Fanni left Marseille after his contract ended. On 11 July 2015 Qatari side Al-Arabi SC signed Fanni on a free transfer.

On 1 February 2016, Fanni signed for Charlton Athletic on loan until the end of season.

Return to Marseille
On 31 August 2016, Fanni returned to Marseille. In February 2018, Marseille announced it had agreed to terminate Fanni's contract at the end of January. Fanni had not made an appearance in the first half of the 2017–18 season.

Montreal Impact
In early March 2018, Montreal Impact announced the signing of Fanni on a contract until June with the option of a further season, pending international transfer certification and a medical.

International career
Fanni made his debut for the France national team against Tunisia on 14 October 2008 in a 3–1 victory. Despite stiff competition from players such as Bacary Sagna and François Clerc, Fanni was named regularly in Raymond Domenech's squad as second choice right-back behind Sagna.

Personal life
Fanni's family originates from Benin. He began his football career whilst pursuing his studies, earning a BEP (French secondary school diploma) and then going on to study for a bachelor's degree in Industrial Science and Technology.

Honours

Club
Marseille
Coupe de la Ligue: 2010–11, 2011–12
Trophée des Champions: 2011

Individual

UNFP Team of the Year: 2008–09, 2009–10

References

External links
 
 
 
 Profile at stade-rennais-online.com

1981 births
Living people
People from Martigues
Association football fullbacks
French footballers
France international footballers
French expatriate footballers
French expatriate sportspeople in Canada
French sportspeople of Beninese descent
Ligue 1 players
Ligue 2 players
Qatar Stars League players
FC Martigues players
RC Lens players
LB Châteauroux players
OGC Nice players
Stade Rennais F.C. players
Al-Arabi SC (Qatar) players
Olympique de Marseille players
Charlton Athletic F.C. players
CF Montréal players
Expatriate footballers in Qatar
Expatriate footballers in England
Expatriate soccer players in Canada
Major League Soccer players
Sportspeople from Bouches-du-Rhône
Footballers from Provence-Alpes-Côte d'Azur
Black French sportspeople